The arrondissement of Orléans is an arrondissement of France in the Loiret department in the Centre-Val de Loire region. It has 121 communes.

Composition

The communes of the arrondissement of Orléans, and their INSEE codes, are:

 Ardon (45006)
 Artenay (45008)
 Baccon (45019)
 Le Bardon (45020)
 Baule (45024)
 Beaugency (45028)
 Boigny-sur-Bionne (45034)
 Bonnée (45039)
 Les Bordes (45042)
 Bou (45043)
 Bougy-lez-Neuville (45044)
 Boulay-les-Barres (45046)
 Bouzy-la-Forêt (45049)
 Bray-Saint Aignan (45051)
 Bricy (45055)
 Bucy-le-Roi (45058)
 Bucy-Saint-Liphard (45059)
 Cercottes (45062)
 Cerdon (45063)
 Chaingy (45067)
 Chanteau (45072)
 La Chapelle-Onzerain (45074)
 La Chapelle-Saint-Mesmin (45075)
 Charsonville (45081)
 Châteauneuf-sur-Loire (45082)
 Chécy (45089)
 Chevilly (45093)
 Cléry-Saint-André (45098)
 Coinces (45099)
 Combleux (45100)
 Combreux (45101)
 Coulmiers (45109)
 Cravant (45116)
 Dampierre-en-Burly (45122)
 Darvoy (45123)
 Donnery (45126)
 Dry (45130)
 Épieds-en-Beauce (45134)
 Fay-aux-Loges (45142)
 Férolles (45144)
 La Ferté-Saint-Aubin (45146)
 Fleury-les-Aubrais (45147)
 Gémigny (45152)
 Germigny-des-Prés (45153)
 Gidy (45154)
 Guilly (45164)
 Huêtre (45166)
 Huisseau-sur-Mauves (45167)
 Ingrannes (45168)
 Ingré (45169)
 Isdes (45171)
 Jargeau (45173)
 Jouy-le-Potier (45175)
 Lailly-en-Val (45179)
 Ligny-le-Ribault (45182)
 Lion-en-Beauce (45183)
 Lion-en-Sullias (45184)
 Loury (45188)
 Marcilly-en-Villette (45193)
 Mardié (45194)
 Mareau-aux-Prés (45196)
 Marigny-les-Usages (45197)
 Ménestreau-en-Villette (45200)
 Messas (45202)
 Meung-sur-Loire (45203)
 Mézières-lez-Cléry (45204)
 Montigny (45214)
 Neuville-aux-Bois (45224)
 Neuvy-en-Sullias (45226)
 Olivet (45232)
 Orléans (45234)
 Ormes (45235)
 Ouvrouer-les-Champs (45241)
 Ouzouer-sur-Loire (45244)
 Patay (45248)
 Rebréchien (45261)
 Rouvray-Sainte-Croix (45262)
 Rozières-en-Beauce (45264)
 Ruan (45266)
 Saint-Aignan-le-Jaillard (45268)
 Saint-Ay (45269)
 Saint-Benoît-sur-Loire (45270)
 Saint-Cyr-en-Val (45272)
 Saint-Denis-de-l'Hôtel (45273)
 Saint-Denis-en-Val (45274)
 Saint-Florent (45277)
 Saint-Hilaire-Saint-Mesmin (45282)
 Saint-Jean-de-Braye (45284)
 Saint-Jean-de-la-Ruelle (45285)
 Saint-Jean-le-Blanc (45286)
 Saint-Lyé-la-Forêt (45289)
 Saint-Martin-d'Abbat (45290)
 Saint-Péravy-la-Colombe (45296)
 Saint-Père-sur-Loire (45297)
 Saint-Pryvé-Saint-Mesmin (45298)
 Saint-Sigismond (45299)
 Sandillon (45300)
 Saran (45302)
 Seichebrières (45305)
 Semoy (45308)
 Sennely (45309)
 Sigloy (45311)
 Sougy (45313)
 Sully-la-Chapelle (45314)
 Sully-sur-Loire (45315)
 Sury-aux-Bois (45316)
 Tavers (45317)
 Tigy (45324)
 Tournoisis (45326)
 Traînou (45327)
 Trinay (45330)
 Vannes-sur-Cosson (45331)
 Vennecy (45333)
 Vienne-en-Val (45335)
 Viglain (45336)
 Villamblain (45337)
 Villemurlin (45340)
 Villeneuve-sur-Conie (45341)
 Villereau (45342)
 Villorceau (45344)
 Vitry-aux-Loges (45346)

History

The arrondissement of Orléans was created in 1800.

As a result of the reorganisation of the cantons of France which came into effect in 2015, the borders of the cantons are no longer related to the borders of the arrondissements. The cantons of the arrondissement of Orléans were, as of January 2015:

 Artenay
 Beaugency
 Châteauneuf-sur-Loire
 Chécy
 Cléry-Saint-André
 La Ferté-Saint-Aubin
 Fleury-les-Aubrais
 Ingré
 Jargeau
 Meung-sur-Loire
 Neuville-aux-Bois
 Olivet
 Orléans-Bannier
 Orléans-Bourgogne
 Orléans-Carmes
 Orléans-La Source
 Orléans-Saint-Marc-Argonne
 Orléans-Saint-Marceau
 Ouzouer-sur-Loire
 Patay
 Saint-Jean-de-Braye
 Saint-Jean-de-la-Ruelle
 Saint-Jean-le-Blanc
 Sully-sur-Loire

References

Orleans